Saphenista cyphoma is a species of moth of the family Tortricidae. It is found in the State of Mexico in Mexico.

References

Moths described in 1994
Saphenista